Luka Stojković (born 28 October 2003) is a Croatian footballer currently playing as a midfielder for Lokomotiva Zagreb.

Career statistics

Club

Notes

References

2003 births
Living people
Footballers from Zagreb
Croatian footballers
Croatia youth international footballers
Association football midfielders
Croatian Football League players
NK Lokomotiva Zagreb players